Raúl Márquez (born August 28, 1971) is an American former professional boxer who competed from 1992 to 2008. He held IBF junior middleweight title between April and December 1997. Márquez also represented the U.S. at the 1992 Summer Olympics in Barcelona.

Personal life
Márquez resides in Houston and works as a color commentator for Showtime. He is married to Jeannette Marquez. He is a father of four boys and one daughter. Raúl Jr., Arturo, Giovanni, Liam and Alina. His son Giovanni was a top amateur boxer who turned professional in March of 2022.

Amateur career
Márquez came to the U.S. in 1976 and began his boxing amateur career. His highlights included:

1987 United States Jr. Olympic welterweight champion
1989 United States amateur welterweight champion
1991 United States amateur light middleweight champion
1991 AIBF light middleweight world amateur champion
Represented the United States at the 1992 Olympics at light middleweight. His results were:
Defeated David Defiagbon (Nigeria) 8–7
Defeated Rival Cadeau (The Seychelles) 20–3
Lost to Orhan Delibaș (Netherlands) 12–16

Professional career
Márquez began his professional career after the 1992 Olympics and got off to an impressive start, winning his first 25 bouts.

IBF light middleweight title challenge
All those bouts set up a shot at the Vacant IBF Light Middleweight Title against Anthony Stephens. Márquez won by TKO to capture the belt. Raúl successfully defended his title twice, including a victory over Keith Mullings, before getting TKO'd by Mexican legend Yori Boy Campas.

Márquez vs. Vargas
In 1999, Márquez challenged then-undefeated IBF light middleweight champion Fernando Vargas, but was dominated and stopped in the eleventh round. Márquez took on another elite fighter in 2003, Shane Mosley, in a fight which ended in a bloody no contest after a clash of heads. In 2004, now campaigning at middleweight, Márquez took on the much stronger and then-undefeated Jermain Taylor, who won by TKO after Márquez's corner decided to pull him out in round nine.

IBF middleweight title run
On June 21, 2008, Márquez defeated Giovanni Lorenzo by unanimous decision in an IBF middleweight title eliminator. The fight took place at the Seminole Hard Rock Hotel and Casino in Hollywood, Florida. Márquez applied pressure, while Lorenzo tried to box from the outside. Márquez's workrate gave Lorenzo problems, for which he often no answer. Márquez was cut over the right eye in round ten, but Lorenzo was docked a point for a headbutt in the same round and the fighters continued to fight after the bell. Scores were 114–113 across the board for Márquez.

On November 8, 2008, at the age of 37, Márquez lost to then-undefeated Arthur Abraham via sixth-round technical knockout at the Bamberg's Jako Arena, in what was the 8th defense of his IBF middleweight title.

Broadcasting
Márquez currently works on the announcing team for Showtime on their Spanish-language broadcasts, as well as the English-language ShoBox: The New Generation series. He has also worked for HBO, NBC, Telefutura and many other networks.

Professional boxing record

See also
List of Mexican boxing world champions
List of light-middleweight boxing champions

References

External links

1971 births
Living people
American male boxers
Boxers from Tamaulipas
Mexican emigrants to the United States
American boxers of Mexican descent
Winners of the United States Championship for amateur boxers
AIBA World Boxing Championships medalists
Olympic boxers of the United States
Boxers at the 1992 Summer Olympics
Light-middleweight boxers
Middleweight boxers
World light-middleweight boxing champions
International Boxing Federation champions
Goodwill Games medalists in boxing
Competitors at the 1990 Goodwill Games